Acraea bergeriana is a butterfly in the family Nymphalidae. It is found in Tanzania.

Biology
The habitat consists of forests at altitudes ranging from 350 to 2,140 meters.

Adults are attracted to flowers.

Taxonomy
It is a member of the Acraea cepheus species group. See also Pierre & Bernaud, 2014.

References

External links

Images representing Acraea bergeriana at Bold

Butterflies described in 1979
bergeriana
Endemic fauna of Tanzania
Butterflies of Africa